Tetraopes annulatus is a species of beetle in the family Cerambycidae. It was described by John Lawrence LeConte in 1847. It is known from the United States and Canada. Reported feeding on Asclepias sullivantii, A. subverticillata, A. speciosa, A. tuberosa, A. verticillata, A. viridiflorus.

References

 Bugguide.net. Image

Tetraopini
Beetles described in 1847